Thyatira dysimata is a moth in the family Drepanidae. It was described by West in 1932. It is found in the Philippines (Luzon).

References

Moths described in 1932
Thyatirinae